Glaessneropsoidea is a superfamily of fossil crabs. They are found in rocks from Late Jurassic age to Late Cretaceous. The 45 species in the superfamily are divided among 11 genera in four families:

Family Glaessneropsidae Patrulius, 1959
Ekalakia Bishop, 1976
Glaessneropsis Patrulius, 1959
Rathbunopon Stenzel, 1945
Vectis Withers, 1946
Verrucarcinus Schweitzer & Feldmann, 2009
Family Lecythocaridae Schweitzer & Feldmann, 2009
Lecythocaris von Meyer, 1860
Family Longodromitidae Schweitzer & Feldmann, 2009
Abyssophthalmus Schweitzer & Feldmann, 2009
Coelopus Étallon, 1861
Longodromites Patrulius, 1959
Planoprosopon Schweitzer, Feldmann & Lazǎr, 2007
Family Nodoprosopidae Schweitzer & Feldmann, 2009
Nodoprosopon Beurlen, 1928

References

Dromiacea
Arthropod superfamilies